Schaan-Vaduz is one of the four train stations serving Liechtenstein, located in the town of Schaan,  from Vaduz. It is owned by the Austrian Federal Railways (ÖBB). The station is served by eighteen trains per day, nine in each direction between Switzerland and Austria.

Overview
Schaan-Vaduz is situated on the international and electrified Feldkirch-Buchs line, between the station of Buchs SG (in Switzerland) and the stop of Forst Hilti (in the northern suburb of Schaan). It is served only by regional trains.

Located in the middle of town, the station is composed of a two-storey building, a wooden shed and a platform serving the first track. The second track has no platform and is rarely used. Located on the platform is the remnants of a rail line, part of a dismantled track system used by freight wagons.

Gallery

See also
 Forst Hilti railway station
 Nendeln railway station
 Schaanwald railway station
 Rail transport in Liechtenstein
 Railway stations in Liechtenstein

References

External links

 Schaan-Vaduz page on www.bahnbilder.de

1872 establishments in Liechtenstein
Railway stations opened in 1872
Railway stations in Liechtenstein
Railway station